Radio 24 is an Italian national radio station mainly devoted to news, founded on 4 October 1999. It is owned by the editorial group Gruppo 24 ORE, which also owns the newspaper Il Sole 24 Ore.

External links
 Official Site

Radio stations in Italy
Radio stations established in 1999
News and talk radio stations
Mass media in Milan
1999 establishments in Italy